The Athletics at the 2016 Summer Paralympics – Women's 800 metres T53 event at the 2016 Paralympic Games took place on heats_date–17 September 2016, at the Estádio Olímpico João Havelange.

Heats

Heat 1 
10:16 17 September 2016:

Heat 2 
10:24 17 September 2016:

Final 
17:46 17 September 2016:

Notes

Athletics at the 2016 Summer Paralympics